Olive Kitteridge is an American television miniseries based on Elizabeth Strout's 2008 novel Olive Kitteridge. Set in Maine, the HBO miniseries features Frances McDormand as the title character, Richard Jenkins as Olive's loving husband Henry Kitteridge, Zoe Kazan as Denise Thibodeau, and Bill Murray as Jack Kennison. The show is divided into four parts, each depicting a certain point of time in the novel.

The miniseries debuted in the United States on November 2, 2014, on the American premium TV network HBO, which aired the show's first two episodes back-to-back that evening; the third and fourth episodes aired back-to-back the following evening. It was shown in a similar format in the United Kingdom on Sky Atlantic, on December 14 and December 15, 2014. It premiered in Australia on showcase from 13 January 2015. At the 67th Primetime Emmy Awards, the miniseries won eight awards including Outstanding Limited Series.

Premise
Olive Kitteridge is a misanthropic and strict, but well-meaning, retired schoolteacher who lives in the fictional seaside town of Crosby, Maine. She is married to Henry Kitteridge, a kind, considerate man who runs a pharmacy downtown, and has a troubled son named Christopher, who grows up to be a podiatrist. For 25 years, Olive has experienced problems of depression, bereavement, jealousy, and friction with family members and friends.

Cast

 Frances McDormand as Olive Kitteridge
 Richard Jenkins as Henry Kitteridge
 Zoe Kazan as Denise Thibodeau
 Rosemarie DeWitt as Rachel Coulson
 Martha Wainwright as Angela O'Meara
 Ann Dowd as Bonnie Newton
 Jesse Plemons as Jerry McCarthy
 Bill Murray as Jack Kennison
 John Gallagher Jr. as Christopher Kitteridge (adult)
 Devin Druid as Christopher Kitteridge (age 13)
 John Mullen as Kevin Coulson (age 13)
 Cory Michael Smith as Kevin Coulson (adult)
 Peter Mullan as Jim O'Casey
 Rachel Brosnahan as Patty Howe
 Brady Corbet as Henry Thibodeau
 Maryann Urbano as Linda Kennison 
 Libby Winters as Suzanne
 Patricia Kalember as Joyce
 Audrey Marie Anderson as Ann
 Donna Mitchell as Louise Larkin
 Frank L. Ridley as Mr. Thibodeau

Episodes

Reception

Critical response
Olive Kitteridge received widespread critical acclaim for its writing, directing, cinematography, and Frances McDormand's central performance as well as those of Jenkins, Murray and Gallagher. On review aggregator Rotten Tomatoes, the show has an approval rating of 95% based on 63 reviews, with an average rating of 8.68/10. The website's critics consensus reads: "Olive Kitteridges narrative slow burn enhances fascinating performances – and a story worthy of its source material." On Metacritic, it has a weighted average score of 89 out of 100, based on 34 critics, indicating "universal acclaim".

Accolades

Home media
Olive Kitteridge was released by HBO on DVD and Blu-ray on February 10, 2015.

References

External links
 

2010s American drama television miniseries
2014 American television series debuts
HBO original programming
Primetime Emmy Award for Outstanding Miniseries winners
Primetime Emmy Award-winning television series
Television shows based on American novels
Television shows set in Maine
Television series by Playtone
Films with screenplays by Jane Anderson